The Billings Refinery is an American oil refinery located in Billings, Montana. The refinery is currently owned and operated by ExxonMobil, which announced on October 20, 2022, that it would sell the refinery to Par Pacific Holdings; the sale is expected to complete in the second quarter of 2023.

The complex is capable of refining  of crude oil per day.

See also
List of oil refineries

References

External links
 Exxon Mobil website

Energy infrastructure in Montana
Buildings and structures in Billings, Montana
Oil refineries in the United States